is a Japanese television jidaigeki or period drama that was broadcast in 1975–1976. It is the 6th in the Hissatsu series. Kenji Misumi was hospitalized while directing episode 13 where he later died.

Plot
Nakamura Mondo retired from professional killer's job but a woman(Okō) suddenly visits Mondo and urges him to withdraw his retirement. He refuses once but he finally decides to come back from his retirement.

Mondo coincidentally witnessed murder during his patrol.
The man who committed murder was a lonely assassin, Ichimatsu. Ichimatsu is a bamboo craftsman but he is also a professional killer. Ichimatsu thought of killing Mondo because he was witnessed his murder by Mondo. One day Nakamura Mondo suddenly visits Ichimatsu to ask him to kill a man. In the final episode of Kurayami Shitomenin Itoi Mitsugu was killed so Mondo has been looking for someone. Ichimatsu and Mondo never trust each other but in the end they start killing villains together. Former monk Ingen also joins them and starts his career as a professional assassin.

Cast

Shiokiya group 
Masaya Oki : Ichimatsu (He was raised by Tobitatsu who killed Ichimatsu's father.)
Makoto Fujita : Nakamura Mondo
Katsutoshi Arata : Ingen
Atsushi Watanabe : Sutezō
Tamao Nakamura : Okō (She runs a barber in Shintomicho.)

Mondo′s family 
Mari Shiraki : Ritsu Nakamura
Kin Sugai : Sen Nakamura

People of Minami Machi Bugyosho 
Katsumi Munakata : Murano (Mondo's　superior)
Masao Komatsu : Kamekichi (Mondo's subordinate)

Directors
Koreyoshi Kurahara Episode1,6,7,12,15,18,28
Kenji Misumi Episode13
Eiichi Kudo Episode19
Tokuzō Tanaka Episode24

Episode list

See also
 Hissatsu Shikakenin (First in the Hissatsu series) 
 Hissatsu Shiokinin  (2nd in the Hissatsu series) 
 Shin Hissatsu Shiokinin (10th in the Hissatsu series)

References

1975 Japanese television series debuts
1970s drama television series
Jidaigeki television series